Li Sixun (651–716 ) was a Chinese noble and painter of landscapes who lived during the Tang dynasty. According to Encyclopædia Britannica, he is considered by Dong Qichang to be the founder of the Northern school of landscape painting.

As a member of the royal family, he had the honorary title of general. His son Li Zhaodao was also a painter and so the father is distinguished as General Li Senior or the Elder.

He used brightly coloured mineral pigments, especially azurite blue and malachite green. His technique was meticulous and detailed so that large works such as murals might take months to complete.

References

651 births
716 deaths
Tang dynasty painters
Tang dynasty politicians